The Sotto family is a Filipino family of entertainers and politicians.

List of members
Filemon Sotto
 Vicente Sotto
 ∞ married Maria Ojeda 
 Suga Sotto
 Voltaire Sotto
 Filemon Sotto
 Vicente Sotto, Jr.
 Marcelino Vicente Sotto 
 ∞ married Herminia Castelo, had four children: Valmar, Tito, Vic and Marcelino.
 Tito Sotto
 ∞ married Helen Gamboa, they have four children: Romina, Diorella, Gian and Ciara.
Romina Sotto
Diorella Sotto
∞ married (anonymous), they have two children.
Gian Sotto
∞ married Joy Woolbright, they have six children.
Ciara Sotto
∞ married Jojo Oconer (annulled), they had one child.
 Vic Sotto 
 ∞ married Dina Bonnevie (annulled), they had two children: Oyo and Danica.
 Danica Sotto
 ∞ married Marc Pingris, they have two children.
 Oyo Boy Sotto 
 ∞ married Kristine Hermosa, they have five children.
 with Angela Luz had:
 Paulina Sotto
 ∞ married Jed Llanes
 with Coney Reyes, actress, had:
 Vico Sotto
 ∞ married Pauleen Luna, they have one child
 Talitha Sotto

References 

Sotto family
Show business families of the Philippines
Political families of the Philippines